Men & Chicken is a 2015 Danish comedy film directed by Anders Thomas Jensen. It was shown in the Vanguard section of the 2015 Toronto International Film Festival. It was one of three films shortlisted by Denmark to be their submission for the Academy Award for Best Foreign Language Film at the 88th Academy Awards.

Plot
Two "brothers" (Gabriel and Elias) are informed  after their father's death that they both are adopted half-brothers. They discover that their biological father is Evelio Thanatos, a geneticist specialised in stem cell research. To learn about their mother and to meet their biological father, the brothers choose to visit the "Island of Ork" where they find out that they have three other half-brothers (Franz, Josef and Gregor). Both Gabriel and Elias are welcomed with a beating. One of the brothers uses the body of a dead mute swan to hit Gabriel. All five half-brothers have hare-lips and unattractive facial features or deformities, although Gabriel states that he had four corrective surgeries. Two of the other brothers' mothers died in childbirth, as did Gabriel's and he is suspicious of this fact. This motivates him to return after a night in the house of the mayor (he finds them on the road at night).

During their second visit, after another fight Franz, Josef and Gregor admire Elias fighting skills and let them come in the house. After a strange meal where the brothers argue about who has the best plate, they go to bed. The next day, Elias, who habitually masturbates throughout the day, wanders off when he finds the toilet occupied. One of the half-brothers (Gregor) follows him and introduces the bull who he says they 'do not touch'. This is odd as he is stroking the bull as he says this. He then shows Elias a room full of chickens and tells him they don't mind as they are big enough to lay eggs. He offers Elias a chicken implying that he might have sex with it. Elias is horrified, but Gregor protests that they are only practicing until they meet girls.

Soon, Gabriel and Elias discover that their father is dead and the other brothers have kept it as a secret. Gabriel contacts Flemming, the Mayor of the Island, and makes arrangements for a proper burial. Gabriel, a professor, recognises their difficult, peculiar and poor social skills of his brothers.  He tries to alter the lifestyle, bringing them a Bible and encouraging communication rather than violence to settle disputes. This is not entirely successful as one brother tells him that he keeps interrupting and should raise his hand to do so!

Gabriel enters his father's basement to find out about his research. The elder half-brother has forbidden this as it was forbidden by their father. There are preserved remains of hybrid animals in the 'lab' and marks on the floor to suggest another hidden area. But Gabriel is found and removed by an angry half-brother. When he has freed himself from the punishment cage he has had enough and he abandons the house, leaving Elias behind.

While Gabriel is away the four brothers go out to find women and jobs, but end up in a series of mishaps at a nursery and then a care home. As Gabriel is about to leave the island with the mayor's daughter, he notices  a stork with tiny human feet and a cleft beak. He remembers other animals he had seen in the house, such as a chicken with tiny hooves, and goes back to the house to investigate. Gabriel breaks into the concealed part of the basement and finds the preserved fetuses of hybrid humans and the remains of the human mothers. The other brothers return and he explains that their father was sterile and used animal sperm spliced with some of his own stem cells to fertilise his various wives. Each of the brothers is genetically part-animal and their mothers were subjected to fatal caesarean births. Gabriel tells each brother what animal they were spliced with: he is part owl, Elias is part bull, and the others were mouse, dog and chicken. The elder brother knew about the research and tries to be proud that he was most successful: 15% chicken, whereas the others have lower animal percentages. These animals were also shown on the plates that they argued about at dinner-time. Gabriel goes outside and speaks to Elias who is in the cage. Elias says he is not normal and Gabriel says 'none of us are'.

In the end the five brothers stay together in the house. The final scene is softly and brightly lit and told like the opening, as if thus is a fable about family. It shows the brothers surrounded by family and children, despite the fact that they are sterile.

Cast
 David Dencik as Gabriel
 Mads Mikkelsen as Elias
 Nikolaj Lie Kaas as Gregor
 Søren Malling as Franz
 Nicolas Bro as Josef
 Ole Thestrup as Mayor Flemming
 Bodil Jørgensen as Ellen

References

External links
 

2015 films
2015 comedy films
Danish comedy films
2010s Danish-language films
Films directed by Anders Thomas Jensen
Films with screenplays by Anders Thomas Jensen